Germany competed at the 2011 World Championships in Athletics from August 27 to September 4 in Daegu, South Korea.

Team selection

The German Athletics Association (Deutscher Leichtathletik-Verband) has announced a preliminary squad of 64 to participate at the competition.  Among the team of 33 men and 31 women are defending world champion Robert Harting and current hammer throw world record holder Betty Heidler. The final team comprises 78 athletes.

The following athletes appeared on the preliminary Entry List, but not on the Official Start List of the specific event, resulting in total number of 65 competitors:

Medalists
The following competitors from Germany won medals at the Championships

| width="78%" align="left" valign="top" |

Results

Men

Decathlon

Women

Heptathlon

References

External links
Official local organising committee website
Official IAAF competition website

Nations at the 2011 World Championships in Athletics
World Championships in Athletics
Germany at the World Championships in Athletics